Julian Bravo (born September 30, 2000) is an American professional soccer player who plays as an defender for MLS Next Pro club Portland Timbers 2.

Career

Youth & College
Bravo attended Claremont High School, where he helped lead the team to League Championship in the Palomares Conference during his sophomore season. While at high school, Bravo also played club soccer at FC Golden State between 2016 and 2018, making 26 appearances for the team.

In 2018, Bravo committed to playing college soccer at Santa Clara University. In four seasons with the Broncos, Bravo made 55 appearances, scoring four goals and tallying six assists.

Professional
On January 11, 2022, Bravo was selected 55th overall in the 2022 MLS SuperDraft by Portland Timbers. On March 28, 2022, it was announced that Bravo had signed with Portland's MLS Next Pro side Portland Timbers 2 for their upcoming season. On May 10, 2022, Bravo signed a short-term deal with the Timbers first team ahead of their Lamar Hunt U.S. Open Cup fixture against Los Angeles FC, where he appeared as an 89th-minute substitute during a 2–0 loss. He finished 2022 with 19 appearances for Timbers 2, where he finished with a single assist.

References

External links

 

2000 births
Living people
American soccer players
Association football defenders
MLS Next Pro players
Portland Timbers draft picks
Portland Timbers players
Portland Timbers 2 players
Santa Clara Broncos men's soccer players
People from Claremont, California
Soccer players from California